Roppenheim is a commune in the Bas-Rhin department, in the cultural region of Alsace, administrative region of Grand Est, northeastern France.

See also
 Communes of the Bas-Rhin department

References

Communes of Bas-Rhin
Bas-Rhin communes articles needing translation from French Wikipedia